Chhattisgarh Mukti Morcha (lit. Chhattisgarh Liberation Front) is a political party in the Indian state of Chhattisgarh.

On 3 March 1977, the Chhattisgarh Mines Shramik Sangh (Chhattisgarh Mines Workers' Union) was founded by Shankar Guha Niyogi. In 1982, CMSS formed CMM as their political front. CMM was formed to fight for the cultural identity of the region and for upliftment for the workers and peasants. CMM organized social campaigns, such as against alcohol abuse and instituted social projects, such as a workers' financed hospital.

Niyogi was murdered in Bhilai 1991.

Today Janak Lal Thakur is the president of CMM and Anoop Singh its secretary.

The motto of CMMs is Sangharsh aur Nirman (Struggle and Construction). Another motto is Virodh Nahi Vikalp (Not resistance, but alternative).

CMM was neutral on the issue of formation of a separate Chhattisgarh state.

CMM is very active in the struggle against genetically modified seeds.

In the legislative assembly elections in Chhattisgarh 2003 CMM had put up eight candidates, whom together mustered 37,335 votes.

External links
Info on CMM from the state webpage
Nyogi Zinda Hai!, documentary on S.G. Niyogi and CMM
Article in Frontline on the formation of the state of Chhattisgarh
Seed Satyagrah - The Great Gene Robbery on the struggle of CMMs against genetically modified seeds
Article in Frontline on the struggle against genetically modified seeds
Memorandum to the President from CMM 2000
Shaheed Niyogi Journalism Award

Political parties in Chhattisgarh
1982 establishments in Madhya Pradesh
Political parties established in 1982